Oschersleben (Bode) is a former Verwaltungsgemeinschaft ("collective municipality") in the district of Börde, in Saxony-Anhalt, Germany. The seat of the Verwaltungsgemeinschaft was in Oschersleben. It was disbanded in September 2010.

The Verwaltungsgemeinschaft Oschersleben consisted of the following municipalities:

 Hadmersleben 
 Oschersleben

References

Former Verwaltungsgemeinschaften in Saxony-Anhalt